Phoberia is a genus of moths in the family Erebidae erected by Jacob Hübner in 1818.

Species
 Phoberia atomaris Hübner, 1818 – common oak moth
 Phoberia ingenua (Walker, 1858)

References

Melipotini
Moth genera